Changwon United FC was a South Korean football club, based in Changwon. Founded as Changwon Doodae FC in 1998, the club changed its name to Changwon United FC in August 2007. It used to be a member of the K3 League, but withdrew from it during the 2008 season.

Season-by-season records

External links
 Changwon United FC Daum cafe

Association football clubs established in 1998
Association football clubs disestablished in 2008
K3 League (2007–2019) clubs
C
Sport in South Gyeongsang Province
Football clubs in South Gyeongsang Province
1998 establishments in South Korea
2008 disestablishments in South Korea